Schreck may refer to:

People
David Schreck, Canadian politician and political pundit
Gustav Schreck (1849-1918), German composer
Julius Schreck (1898-1936), early Nazi Party member
Johann Schreck (1576-1630), German Jesuit, missionary to China, and polymath
Mason Schreck (born 1993), American football player
Max Schreck (1879-1936), German actor
Sam Schreck (born 1999), German footballer
Stephan Schreck (born 1978), German road bicycle racer
Ossee Schreckengost (1875-1914), American baseball player, also competed as Ossee Schreck

Other
Schreck Ensemble, a Dutch new music ensemble

Aircraft
Franco-British Aviation (Schreck FBA), a French aircraft company specializing in flying boats

See also
Shrek (disambiguation)
Shreck (disambiguation)
Schrecker, a surname

German-language surnames